Grace Pegram Truss Railroad Bridge is a Pegram through truss bridge over the Bear River near Grace, Idaho.  It was originally built in 1894 and was moved to its current location by the Union Pacific in 1913.

References

Railroad bridges on the National Register of Historic Places in Idaho
Bridges completed in 1894
Transportation in Caribou County, Idaho
Bridges completed in 1913
National Register of Historic Places in Caribou County, Idaho
1913 establishments in Idaho
Union Pacific Railroad bridges
Relocated buildings and structures in Idaho
Pegram trusses